The Pasco Province is one of the three provinces that make up the Pasco Region in Peru. The capital of this province is the city Cerro de Pasco.

Boundaries 
North: Huánuco Region
East: Oxapampa Province
South: Junín Region
West: Lima Region, Daniel A. Carrión Province

Geography 
The Waqurunchu mountain range traverses the province. Other mountain are listed below:

Administrative division 

Chaupimarca
Huachón
Huariaca
Huayllay
Ninacaca
Pallanchacra
Paucartambo
San Francisco de Asís de Yarusyacán
Simón Bolívar
Ticlacayán
Tinyahuarco
Vicco
Yanacancha

Population 
The province has an approximate population of 123,015 inhabitants (2017).

See also
 Administrative divisions of Peru

References

Provinces of the Pasco Region